Ballıca is a village in the Nazımiye District, Tunceli Province, Turkey. The village is populated by Kurds of the Kurêşan tribe and had a population of 80 in 2021.

The hamlets of Akbulut, Ballıdere, Beşik, Boncuk, Boylu, Çayönü, Göktaş, Konuksever, Küre and Sungur are attached to the village.

References 

Villages in Nazımiye District
Kurdish settlements in Tunceli Province